Tata or TATA may refer to:

Places 
 Jamshedpur, a city in Jharkhand, India also known as Tatanagar or Tata
 Tata, Hungary, a town in Hungary
 Tata Islands, a pair of small islands off the coast of New Zealand
 Tata, Morocco, a city in Tata Province
 Tata Province, Morocco
 Țâța River, a tributary of the Ialomiţa River in Romania

Companies 
 Tata Sons, India's largest conglomerate and owner of Tata Group
 Tata Group, an Indian multinational conglomerate company
 List of entities associated with Tata Group

People

Surname 
 Tata family, an influential family of India owning the Tata Group
 Jamsetji Tata (1839–1904), known as the father of Indian industry
 Dorabji Tata (1859–1932), Indian industrialist and philanthropist
 Ratanji Tata (1871–1918), financier and philanthropist, son of Jamsetji Tata
 J. R. D. Tata (1904–1993), Indian pioneer aviator and founder of Tata Airlines
 Naval H. Tata (1904–1989), industrialist, recipient of Padma Bhushan
 Ratan Naval Tata (born 1937), chairman of the Tata Group (1991–2012)
 Simone Tata (born 1930), chairperson of Trent
 Noel Tata (born 1957), vice-chairman of Trent Ltd and managing director of Tata International, son of Simone Tata
 Anthony Tata (born 1959), US Army general and politician
 Bob Tata (1930–2021), American politician
 Daniel Tata (born 1990), Indonesian footballer
 Herabai Tata (1879–1941), Indian suffragist
 Joe E. Tata (1936–2022), American actor
 Jordan Tata (born 1981), American baseball player
 Mithan Jamshed Lam (née Tata; 1898–1981) Indian barrister and lawyer at the Bombay High Court
 Sam Tata (1911–2005), Canadian photographer
 Terry Tata (born 1940), American baseball umpire

Given name or nickname 
 Augusto Pinochet (1915–2006), Chilean dictator, commonly referred to in Chile as "El tata"
 Carlos Manuel Baldomir (born 1971), Argentine boxer nicknamed "Tata"
 Gerardo Martino (born 1962), former football player and current manager, more commonly known as "Tata"
 Nelson Mandela (1918–2013), South African President, commonly known in South Africa as Tata
 Tata Amaral (born 1960), Brazilian director, writer, producer, and actor
 Tata Esteban (1954–2003), Filipino producer-director
 Tata Giacobetti (1922–1988), Italian singer
 Tata Güines (1930–2008), Cuban percussionist
 Tata Simonyan (born 1962), Armenian singer
 Táta Vega (born 1951), American vocalist
 Tatá Werneck (born 1983), Brazilian actress
 Tata Young (born 1980), Thai singer, model and actress

Other uses 
 Sir Dorabji Tata and Allied Trusts, a trust founded by Dorabji Tata
 TATA box, a DNA sequence
 Tata Manavadu, a 1972 Telugu film
 TTFN or "ta ta for now", an alternative way to say goodbye
 Tata (Middle-earth), one of the first Elves in J. R. R. Tolkien's Middle-earth legendarium
 Station code for Tatanagar Railway Station
 Internet slang for Human Breast

See also 
 Ta-Ta, the Uruguayan subsidiary of Almacenes_Tía
 Tatar (disambiguation)
 Tatra (disambiguation)
 Data (disambiguation)
 Dada (disambiguation)